Sabinov District (okres Sabinov) is a district in the Prešov Region of eastern Slovakia. It lies on the highlands of Šarišská vrchovina. The district had been established in 1923 and from 1996 exists in its present borders. Food, pharmaceutical and clothing industry and located foremost in its  towns and Šarišské Michaľany. In the district are three recreational centers, mainly used during winter and skiing season.  Overall, the district suffers from the high unemployment rate. In Sabinov district are 43 municipalities, in two of them are towns.

Municipalities

Bajerovce
Bodovce
Brezovica
Brezovička
Červená Voda
Červenica pri Sabinove
Daletice
Drienica
Dubovica
Ďačov
Hanigovce
Hubošovce
Jakovany
Jakubova Voľa
Jakubovany
Jarovnice
Kamenica
Krásna Lúka
Krivany
Lipany
Lúčka
Ľutina
Milpoš
Nižný Slavkov
Olejníkov
Oľšov
Ostrovany
Pečovská Nová Ves
Poloma
Ratvaj
Ražňany
Renčišov
Rožkovany
Sabinov
Šarišské Dravce
Šarišské Michaľany
Šarišské Sokolovce
Tichý Potok
Torysa
Uzovce
Uzovské Pekľany
Uzovský Šalgov
Vysoká

References

Districts of Slovakia
Geography of Prešov Region